Bengali Film Directory is an archive of Bengali films (in English). Published in March 1999 by Nandan, West Bengal Film Centre (Calcutta), this directory was edited by Ansu Sur and was compiled by Abhijit Goswami. It includes all Bengali feature films released from 1917 to 1998, described briefly, but including detailed cast and crew, director name, release date and release theater name.

Contents
 Acknowledgements iv
 A Note from the Editor v
 Reference vi
 Abbreviations vii
 Filmography
 Silent era 1
 Sound era 9
 Studios and Post-Production Centres 267
 Production Companies 269
 Distributions 271
 Show-houses 274
 Useful Addresses 277
 Film Societies 278
 Film Journals 280
 Film Books 281
 Index
 Films 285
 Directors 298
 Actors and Actresses 303
 Appendix: Films released in 1998 315

References

External links

Cinema of Bengal
Bengali language
1999 books
Bengali-language mass media
English-language mass media
Film guides
Directories